Tigridania is a genus of moths in the subfamily Arctiinae. It contains the single species Tigridania quadricincta, which is found in Peru.

References

Arctiinae